Jordan Murphy (born 5 June 1996) is an English professional footballer who plays as a forward for Solihull Moors.

Playing career

Walsall
Murphy played youth football for Stourbridge, before being signed by League One side Walsall in September 2014. He went on loan to Worcester City, helping the Conference North side to knock out Football League side Coventry City and take Scunthorpe United to a replay. He made his "Saddlers" debut on 14 February, coming on for Michael Cain 80 minutes into a 1–0 defeat to Port Vale at the Bescot Stadium.

After making 2 appearances for Walsall, Murphy was then later released at the end of the 2015/16 campaign.

Kidderminster Harriers
On 9 October, Murphy penned a one-month loan deal with Kidderminster Harriers  He scored on his Harriers debut, a 2–1 loss away at Macclesfield. He scored the only goal in a 1–0 home win against Woking, Harriers first win of the season coming after 18 games. The next home game, he assisted Harriers first goal in a 2–0 home win against Aldershot.

Solihull Moors
He signed for Solihull Moors in July 2018. On 24 December 2018, he joined Leamington on an initial one-month loan deal. The deal was later extended, but however, he was recalled on 25 April 2019.  On 2 August 2019, Murphy went out on loan to Leamington once again until 31 January 2020.

Statistics

References

External links

1996 births
Living people
English footballers
Association football forwards
Stourbridge F.C. players
Walsall F.C. players
Worcester City F.C. players
English Football League players
National League (English football) players
AFC Telford United players
Solihull Moors F.C. players
Kidderminster Harriers F.C. players
Leamington F.C. players